Interavia was a Swiss monthly magazine on aerospace published in English, French, German and Spanish between 1946 and 1993: .

In September 1992, Interavia was the leader of the aerospace press with a magazine circulation of 42,602 as French press group :fr:Le Revenu bought it from Jane's Information Group, a Thomson Corporation subsidiary at the time.
It was to merge by October with monthly Aerospace World (circulation: 31,500) as Le Revenu also published Air & Cosmos (41,509) and Aéronautique et Astronautique (6,000), controlling 30% of the aerospace publications market with a ₣300 million revenue.

See also
 Flight International 
 Air & Cosmos

References

Aviation magazines
Business magazines
Defunct magazines published in Switzerland
English-language magazines
French-language magazines
German-language magazines
Magazines established in 1946
Magazines disestablished in 1993
Magazines published in Geneva
Monthly magazines published in Switzerland
Spanish-language magazines